United Arrows  is a  Japanese clothing brand  founded in 1989 by Yasuto Kamoshita, Hirofumi Kurino and Osamu Shigematsu. Its sub-brand  Camoshita United Arrows was established in 2007.
The brand has collaborated with New Balance, The North Face, Dr. Martens, adidas, HUF, and others.

See also
Billionaire Boys Club
Nigo
Supreme
A Bathing Ape
Virgil Abloh
OVO
Chrome Hearts
Opening Ceremony

References

External links

Clothing brands of Japan
High fashion brands
Fashion accessory brands
Clothing companies established in 1989
Retail companies established in 1989
1989 establishments in Japan
Luxury brands
2000s fashion
2010s fashion